Hive Mind is the third studio album by rock band Sinch, released on March 20, 2012.

Background
At the start of 2009, Sinch started work on a fan-funded album, since they were no longer supported by a record label. They began recording in June of the same year, but due to the band members also holding down full-time jobs recording would take around 2 years to complete. By August 2011 the album was in the mixing stage and the release was being planned.
The album finally saw the light of day as a digital download, available to those that contributed to the making of the album, on March 20, 2012, with a physical version planned to be available before the end of that month.

Track listing

Personnel
Credits are adapted from the band's Bandcamp website.

Sinch
Jamie Stem - vocals, lyrics
Tony Lannutti - guitar, sound design
Dan McFarland - drums
Mike Abramson - bass

Credits
Produced by Sinch and Rob Fisher (rfisheraudio.com)
Recorded, mixed and engineered by Rob Fisher
Additional production and engineering by John Fachet
Additional production by Tony Lannutti
Mix Consultant - Drew Mazurek (drewmazurek.com)
Mastered by Drew Mazurek
Recorded at Sweet Creek Studios (sweetcreekstudios.com)
Artwork by Jónas Valtýsson (jonasval.com)

References

2012 albums
Sinch (band) albums